Yasmine Galenorn is an American novelist. She writes urban fantasy, paranormal romance, and paranormal mystery. She previously wrote under the pen name India Ink for her Bath and Body series.

Biography
Galenorn graduated from Evergreen State College, having majored in theater and creative writing. She is the author of over fifty novels and nonfiction books, including the Otherworld Series, the Fury Unbound Series, the Bewitching Bedlam Series, the Indigo Court Series, the Chintz 'n China Series, and the upcoming Wild Hunt Series. Publishers Weekly wrote about Witchling (2006), the first entry in the Otherworld series: "Though the plot can drag, effusive characters and pretty writing ('I whispered, and the stars heard me from behind their cloud cover and answered') will lead readers through to the much-anticipated final battle." She was with Berkley Publishing from 2002 to 2016 and has now branched out into indie/self publishing.

Works

The Wild Hunt

 The Silver Stag (March 2018) 
 Oak and Thorns  (July 2018) 
 Iron Bones (August 2018) 
A Shadow of Crows (December 2018) 
The Hallowed Hunt (February 2019) 
The Silver Mist (May 2019) 
Witching Hour (An Ante-Fae Adventure) (July 2019) 
Witching Bones (An Ante-Fae Adventure) (September 2019) 
A Sacred Magic (October 2019) 
The Eternal Return (December 2019) 
Sun Broken (April 2020) 
Witching Moon (An Ante-Fae Adventure) (June 2020) 
Autumn's Bane (August 2020) 
Witching Time (An Ante-Fae Adventure) (October 2020) 
Hunter's Moon (January 2021) 
Witching Fire (An Ante-Fae Adventure)(March 2021) 
Veil of Stars (August 2021) 
Antlered Crown (Novella) (January 2022)

Moonshadow Bay Series 

 Starlight Web (December 2020) 
 Midnight Web (March 2021) 
 Conjure Web (April 2021) 
 Harvest Web (October 2021) 
Shadow Web (November 2021) 
Weaver's Web (July 2022) 
Crystal Web (August 2022) 
Witch's Web (January 2023) 
Cursed Web (May 2023)
Magic Happens Series

 Shadow Magic (November 2022) 
 Charmed to Death (January 2023)

Hedge Dragon Series 

 The Poisoned Forest (A Wild Hunt Adventure)(February 2022) 
The Tangled Sky (Novella) (A Wild Hunt Adventure) (March 2022)

Night Queen Series 

 Tattered Thorns (A Wild Hunt Adventure)(June 2022) 
 Shattered Spells (A Wild Hunt Adventure)(April 2023)
 Fractured Flowers (A Wild Hunt Adventure)(June 2023)

Lily Bound Series 

 Souljacker (November 2021) 
Soulbender (TBA)

Whisper Hollow Series 
 Autumn Thorns (January 2020)  
 Shadow Silence (January 2020)  
The Phantom Queen (February 2020)

Fury Unbound Series
Series Arc 1:

 Fury Rising (June 2016) 
 Fury's Magic (November 2016) 
 Fury Awakened (June 2017) 
 Fury Calling (August 2017) 

Series Arc 2: 

 Fury's Mantle (October 2018)

Indigo Court Series

 Night Myst (June 2010) 
 Night Veil (July 2011) 
 Night Seeker (July 2012) 
 Night Vision (July 2013) 
 Night's End (July 2014) 
 Night Shivers (Indigo Court Novella) (July 2018)

E-book Boxed Sets 

 Indigo Court Books, 1-3: Night Myst, Night Veil, Night Seeker Boxed Set (April 2019)
 Indigo Court Books, 4-6: Night Vision, Night’s End, Night Shivers Boxed Set (April 2019)

Bewitching Bedlam Series

 Blood Music (novella) (October 2016)
 Bewitching Bedlam (January 2017) 
 Blood Vengeance (novella) (September 2017)
 Tiger Tails (novella) (September 2017)
 Maudlin's Mayhem (July 2017) 
 Siren's Song (October 2017) 
 Witches Wild (December 2017) 
 Casting Curses (September 2018) 
 Demon's Delight (February 2020)

Short Stories 
The Wish Factor: A Bewitching Bedlam Short Story (September 2018)

The Otherworld Series
 Witchling (October 2006) 
 Changeling (June 2007) 
 Darkling (January 2008) 
 Dragon Wytch (July 2008) 
 Night Huntress (January 2009) 
 Demon Mistress (June 2009) 
 Bone Magic (January 2010) 
 Harvest Hunting, (October 2010), 
 Blood Wyne, (February 2011), 
 Courting Darkness (November 2011) 
 Shaded Vision (February 2012) 
 Shadow Rising (November 2012) 
 Haunted Moon (January 2013) 
 Autumn Whispers (September 24, 2013) 
 Crimson Veil (January 28, 2014) 
 Priestess Dreaming (September 30, 2014) 
 Panther Prowling (January 27, 2015) 
 Darkness Raging (2016) 
 Moon Shimmers (April 2017) 
 Harvest Song (May 2018) 
 Blood Bonds (April 2019)

Chintz 'n China Mystery Series

 Ghost of A Chance 
 Legend of the Jade Dragon 
 Murder Under A Mystic Moon 
 A Harvest of Bones 
 One Hex of a Wedding 
Well of Secrets (June 2021)

E-book Boxed Sets 

 Chintz ‘n China Books, 1 – 3: Ghost of a Chance, Legend of the Jade Dragon, Murder Under A Mystic Moon (April 2019) 
 Chintz ‘n China Books, 4-6: A Harvest of Bones, One Hex of a Wedding, Holiday Spirits (April 2019)

Bath and Body Series (writing as India Ink) 

 Scent To Her Grave 
 A Blush With Death 
 Glossed and Found

Nonfiction Pagan Titles

 Crafting the Body Divine: Ritual, Movement and Body Art 
 Embracing the Moon 
 Sexual Ecstasy 
 Magical Meditations 
 Totem Magic 
 Trancing The Witch's Wheel 
 Dancing With The Sun 
 Tarot Journey

Fly By Night Series (set in Otherworld)

 Flight From Hell (2014) 
 Flight from Death (2015) 
 Flight from Mayhem (2016)

Anthologies and collections

References

External links
 Author's Website
 Fantastic Fiction
 Ten Speed Press
 Berkley Prime Crime

Living people
21st-century American novelists
American mystery writers
American romantic fiction writers
American fantasy writers
American horror writers
American women novelists
Women science fiction and fantasy writers
Women horror writers
Women romantic fiction writers
Women mystery writers
21st-century American women writers
Year of birth missing (living people)
American modern pagans
Modern pagan novelists